Kabletown is an unincorporated community in Jefferson County, West Virginia, United States. The town lies along a spring-fed stream called Bullskin Run near the Shenandoah River on Kabletown Road (County Route 25), very close to the border with Virginia. Kabletown's population was 10,073 in 2000.

The community derives its name from the local Kable family.

The Civil War battle, The Battle of Kabletown took place there on November 18, 1864, between Mosby's Rangers and Blazer's Scouts.

References

Unincorporated communities in Jefferson County, West Virginia
Unincorporated communities in West Virginia